Bukena Airport  is a rural airstrip serving the hamlet of Bukena in Haut-Lomami Province, Democratic Republic of the Congo.

See also

 Transport in the Democratic Republic of the Congo
 List of airports in the Democratic Republic of the Congo
 Talk:Bukena Airport

References

External links
 OurAirports - Bukena Airport
 FallingRain - Bukena Airport
HERE Maps - Bukena
OpenStreetMap - Bukena Airport
 

Airports in Haut-Lomami